John Harry Panabaker (July 31, 1928 – February 5, 2023) was a Canadian insurance executive who served as the Chancellor of McMaster University from 1986 to 1992.  He served as president and CEO of Mutual Life of Canada from 1973 to 1982, and chair and CEO from 1982 to 1985.

Panabaker died on February 5, 2023, at the age of 94.

References

1928 births
2023 deaths
McMaster University alumni
People from the Regional Municipality of Waterloo